The San Carlos Hotel is a historic hotel in Yuma, Arizona. Its construction cost $300,000, and it was completed in 1930. It was five stories high, with 107 bedrooms. It was remodelled into 59 residential apartments in the 1980s.

The building was designed in the Art Deco architectural style by Dorr and Gibbs, a firm based in Los Angeles. It has been listed on the National Register of Historic Places since April 12, 1984.

References

Art Deco architecture in Arizona
Buildings and structures in Yuma, Arizona
Hotel buildings completed in 1930
Hotel buildings on the National Register of Historic Places in Arizona
National Register of Historic Places in Yuma County, Arizona
1930 establishments in Arizona